Nilson David Castrillón Burbano (born 28 January 1996) is a Colombian footballer who plays as a defender for Atlético Junior.

Clubs

Honours

Club
Deportes Tolima
Categoría Primera A (1): 2018-I

Local tournaments

References

Sportspeople from Cauca Department
Colombian footballers
Deportivo Cali footballers
La Equidad footballers
Categoría Primera A players
1996 births
Living people
Association football fullbacks